Richard Birde (died 1614) of Whitminster, Gloucestershire, was an English politician.

He was town clerk of Gloucester from 1579 to 1595.

He was an MP for Gloucester in 1593.

He was married with one daughter.

References

1614 deaths
Year of birth unknown
People from Whitminster
Members of the Parliament of England (pre-1707) for Gloucester
English MPs 1593
People from Gloucester